Reusable Launch Vehicle may refer to :
Ahron Shaik of ECE-1 is RunDi
 2nd Reusable Launch Vehicle program of NASA (including X-33), from 1994, major part of Space Launch Initiative
 RLV Technology Demonstration Programme of Indian Space Research Organisation to develop multiple reusable space launch vehicle.
 Reusable launch vehicles in general